Friends and Crocodiles is a one-off British television drama production, written and directed by  Stephen Poliakoff and first broadcast on BBC One on 15 January 2006.

Overview
The film charts the shifting power between a boss and his secretary as their careers rise and fall
in the rapidly changing workplace of 1980s and 1990s Britain. Friends and Crocodiles stars Damian Lewis, Jodhi May and Robert Lindsay with an ensemble cast that includes Patrick Malahide and Eddie Marsan.

Damian Lewis plays Paul, a Gatsby-like figure and inspirational entrepreneur. He is a host of fabulous parties, a "collector" of interesting people, a visionary with dreams of new urban landscapes, and keeper of a pet crocodile. Jodhi May plays Lizzie, who is persuaded by Paul to become his secretary and bring some order to his creative chaos. Once at Paul's magnificent house, Lizzie's world expands as she meets artists, historians and politicians.

The drama was loosely linked to a second Poliakoff piece, Gideon's Daughter, broadcast the following month. Although the links were more thematic than narrative, the character of Sneath (Lindsay) reappeared in Gideon's Daughter, acting as the narrator.

Cast

Trivia
The location of the final scene around the fire is Weavers Fields in Bethnal Green.

References

External links
 Friends and Crocodiles at bbc.co.uk.

BBC television dramas
Films directed by Stephen Poliakoff
2006 television films
2006 films
2000s business films